The Tärendö River (Swedish: Tärendö älv, Meänkieli: Täränönväylä) is a small distributary river to the Kalix River in Norrbotten, Sweden.
It is the second largest bifurcation in the world (second only to the Casiquiare canal, South America).

The Tärendö River splits off the Torne River in Pajala Municipality, near the village of Junosuando, at an altitude of 210 m. It takes more than 50% of the water in the Torne River.

It flows southeast for 52 km, passing Lautakoski and Koijuniemi, then empties into the Kalix River at the village of Tärendö at an altitude of 160 m.

Tributuaries to the right side of the Tärendö River are Meras River, Leppä River, Saitta River, and Jukkas River.
The Kari River flows into the Tärendö River on the left.

Like many other rivers in Nordkalotten and Norrland, the river is popular for fishing.

References

External links
 Tärendö river on Google Streetview

Norrbotten
Kalix River basin
Rivers of Norrbotten County
River bifurcations
Distributaries of Europe